Carlos Rodríguez Cárdenas is a Cuban painter.

Biography
Rodríguez Cárdenas was born in 1962 in Sancti Spiritus, Villa Clara, and completed his arts studies in 1983 at Havana’s Instituto Superior de Arte (ISA).

He formed part of the René Portocarrero workshop, where he began to make a name for himself in serigraphy, drawing and painting. He became a key figure in the resurgence of criticism and of the arts movement at the time. His participation played a decisive role in the birth of the provisional group. From among the imagery created in the late 1980s, which questioned and made ironic the “revolutionary” state slogans, some of Rodríguez Cárdenas's proposals became iconic representations of his generation such as his self-portrait featuring him bare-chested, the skin painted like a brick wall, on which the words ”I am my home” are written; from his neck hangs a skeleton with a comic blurb that reads “I do not exist, only my intention”.

In Rodríguez Cárdenas's work, parody, humor and caricature tend away from coarseness, although they may confront the audience with what is vulgar in a society in crisis. His work invites the spectator to question reality, to see beyond the world of the official word imposed by a system that had become senseless.  More than anyone, he suffered censorship. In his case, it was not a conjured-up badge of honor that he pinned on himself to face banishment from his country.

From the time after he went into exile in Mexico in the early 1990s until he finally settled in New York, he focused his art, without renouncing his previous commitments, on the artistic quality of his subjects, of this designs. His art imparted his compositions with even more of their own particular, distinctive character than before.

During the next few years, Rodríguez Cárdenas held solo exhibits at Obra Reciente, Galeria Nina Menocal, Mexico; D.F., Carlos Cardenas, Galeria Ramis F. Barquet in Monterrey, Mexico; About the Blue Wall, Fredric Snitzer Gallery, Coral Gables, Florida; ARCO 93 International Art Fair, Madrid, Spain; and Pinturas, Fredric Snitzer Gallery, Coral Gables.

Today his works are included in such major collections as the Whitney Museum of American Art in New York; the Museum of Fine Arts in Boston; the Museum of Art in Fort Lauderdale, Florida; Kendall Art Center / The Rodriguez Collection; the Museum Ludwig in Cologne, Germany; the Villa Clara Provincial Museum in Villa Clara; and Museo Nacional de Bellas Artes de La Habana in Havana.

Rodríguez Cárdenas lives and works in the New York area.

References

 
 Carlos Rodríguez Cárdenas samples
 Carlos Rodríguez Cardenas Collection
 ARTPULSE magazine review

1962 births
Cuban artists
Cuban emigrants to the United States
Living people
Instituto Superior de Arte alumni